Zigomar the Eelskin (Also known as Zigomar the Black Scourge) is a 1913 French crime drama silent film directed by Victorin-Hippolyte Jasset and produced by Éclair. It was the third movie made by Jasset that used the character of Zigomar (who was originally created by the author Léon Sazie in 1909), and the second sequel to Zigomar. The story is an adaptation of a story of the same name that was published in the French newspaper Le Matin from June 30-August 26, 1912. The film follows Paul Broquet, the chief of police, as he struggles to recapture the escaped crime lord Zigomar and his ally, La Rosaria. The cast consists of Alexandre C. Arquillière as Zigomar, André Liabel as Paul Broquet, and Josette Andrio as La Rosaria. The movie was split into the three parts: The Resurrection of Zigomar (La Résurrection de Zigomar), The Elephant Burglar (L’Eléphant cambrioleur), and The Air Brigand (Le Brigand de l’air).

Plot
Taking place after Zigomar contre Nick Carter, Zigomar is taken to a medical examiner for an autopsy after having poisoned himself at the end of the previous film. Before they start, Paul Broquet requests a sample of Zigomar's skin for his files. However, the examiner is attacked by La Rosaria who then gives Zigomar the antidote to his poison and helps him escape through the window. Shortly after, Paul Broquet is lured into a trap and brought before Zigomar, who offers him a generous £50,000 if he leaves him to pursue his criminal activities freely. Paul refuses, and is put inside of a wooden cage as Zigomar and La Rosaria leave to plan their next heist. Luckily, however, his lieutenant finds out where he is being held and frees the police chief.
Meanwhile, Zigomar and La Rosaria have launched their plan, stealing a lockbox of money won by a lottery with the help of a circus elephant. They almost escape into the sewers, but the ground gives way beneath the two and they barely escape the collapse. By now, the others at the carnival have become aware of the attempted theft, and have reported it to Paul, who disguises himself as a circus hand and begins working undercover in the circus. He eventually hears an incriminating conversation between Zigomar and his accomplice and attempts to accost the duo. However, they quickly disguise themselves as Romani people and duck into a parade, successfully escaping once again.
Next Paul discovers that Zigomar and his Gang of Z have moved to Italy, where they plan to rob an Italian banker. He tries to warn the banker ahead of time, but Zigomar finds out before he arrives, and plans to blow up the mountain railway he would be travelling on. Paul is alerted to the danger by his assistant, however, and goes by boat instead.
When Zigomar finds out about this change, he decides enough is enough and drops bombs onto the boat from a plane. Paul is not killed, however, and manages to warn the banker ahead of time despite the setback. The banker, however, already had a plan in case of a situation such as this, and shows Broquet that his safe is trapped, and when Zigomar and his gang try to open it, it triggers. The trap floods the room with water, and everyone is arrested. 
In court, Zigomar is sentenced to penal servitude, a sentence which puts a mysterious smile on the criminal's face.

Cast
Alexandre C. Arquillière (Zigomar)
André Liabel (Paul Broquet)
Josette Andriot (La Rosaria)
Atillio Maffel (The Aviator)
Camille Bardou (Cast Member)

Filming
The movie was filmed by Epinay Studios and directed by Victorin-Hippolyte Jasset.

References 

1913 films
French silent films
French crime drama films
1910s crime drama films
1910s French-language films
Silent crime drama films